is a major railway station and transportation hub in Kyōto, Japan. It has Japan's second-largest station building (after Nagoya Station) and is one of the country's largest buildings, incorporating a shopping mall, hotel, movie theater, Isetan department store, and several local government facilities under one 15-story roof. It also housed the Kyōto City Air Terminal until August 31, 2002.

Lines 

Kyoto Station is served by the following railway lines:
  
  
  
   (Tōkaidō Main Line)
   (Tōkaidō Main Line)
  
  

  
  

In addition to the lines above, the following lines, among others, have through services to Kyoto Station:
 JR West

JR West/JR Central

Layout
The station has a side platform and four island platforms serving eight tracks for the Tokaido Line (Biwako Line, JR Kyoto Line) and Kosei Line at ground level, three dead-end platforms serving four tracks for the Sanin Line (Sagano Line) to the west of platform 0 at ground level, and two dead-end platforms serving 3 tracks to the south of platform 7 at ground level. Two island platforms serving four tracks for the Shinkansen are elevated, above the platforms for the Kintetsu Kyoto Line.

Limited express trains
for the Hokuriku Line
limited express Thunderbird: Osaka - , 
for the Tokaido Line, and the Takayama Line

limited express Hida: Osaka - 
limited express Biwako Express: Osaka - Maibara
for the Sanin region via the Chizu Express Chizu Line
limited express Super Hakuto: Kyoto - Tottori, Kurayoshi
for the Hanwa Line, Kansai Airport Line and the Kinokuni Line
Kansai Airport limited express Haruka: Maibara, Kyoto - Kansai Airport
limited express Kuroshio: Kyoto, Shin-Osaka - Shirahama, Shingu
for the Sanin Line, the Maizuru Line and the Kitakinki Tango Railway lines
limited express Maizuru: Kyoto -

Adjacent stations

Kintetsu

Layout
The station has three levels. Four dead-end platforms serving four tracks are located on the second floor. The 1st floor is a shopping street and the 3rd floor is the platforms for the Shinkansen (JR Central).

Adjacent stations

Kyoto City Subway

Layout
The station consists of one underground island platform serving two tracks.

History

The governmental railway from  reached Kyoto on 5 September 1876, but the station was under construction and a temporary facility called Ōmiya-dōri (Ōmiya Street) Temporary Station was used until the opening of the main station. The first Kyoto Station opened for service by decree of Emperor Meiji on 5 February 1877.

In 1889, the railway became a part of the trunk line to Tokyo (Tokaido Main Line). Subsequently, the station became the terminal of two private railways, Nara Railway (1895, present-day Nara Line) and Kyoto Railway (1897, present-day Sagano Line), that connected the station with southern and northern regions of Kyoto Prefecture, respectively.

The station was replaced by a newer, Renaissance-inspired facility in 1914, which featured a broad square (the site of demolished first station) leading from the station to Shichijō Avenue. Before and during World War II, the square was often used by imperial motorcades when Emperor Showa traveled between Kyoto and Tokyo. The station was spacious and designed to handle a large number of people, but when a few thousand people gathered to bid farewell to naval recruits on 8 January 1934, 77 people were crushed to death. This station burned to the ground in 1950, and was replaced by a more utilitarian concrete facility in 1952.

The current Kyoto Station opened in 1997, commemorating Kyoto's 1,200th anniversary. It is 70 meters high and 470 meters from east to west, with a total floor area of 238,000 square meters. Architecturally, it exhibits many characteristics of futurism, with a slightly irregular cubic façade of plate glass over a steel frame. The architect was Hiroshi Hara.

Kyoto, one of the least modern cities in Japan by virtue of its many cultural heritage sites, was largely reluctant to accept such an ambitious structure in the mid-1990s: The station's completion began a wave of new high-rise developments in the city that culminated in the 20-story Kyocera Building.

Aside from the main building on the north side of the station, the Hachijō-guchi building on the south side was built to house Tokaido Shinkansen which started operation in 1964. The underground facilities of the station, including the shopping mall Porta beneath the station square, were constructed when the subway opened in 1981.

Station numbers were introduced to the JR Lines in March 2018. Kyoto Station was assigned:

 JR-A31 for the Tokaido Main Line
 JR-B31 for the Kosei Line
 JR-E01 for the San'in Main Line
 JR-D01 for the Nara Line

Passenger statistics
In fiscal 2016, the JR West part of the station was used by an average of 200,426 passengers daily (boarding passengers only), making it the second busiest JR West station after . The Kyoto City Subway station was used by an average of 123,360 passengers daily (in fiscal 2016).

Surrounding area

 Shichijō Station (Keihan Main Line)

Karasuma Gate
Kyoto Station Building
JR Kyoto Isetan
Kyoto Station Shopping street "The Cube"
Hotel Granvia Kyoto
Kyoto Gekijo
Museum of Art "Eki" Kyoto
Kyoto Station Underground Mall "Porta"
Kyoto-Yodobashi
Hotel New Hankyu Kyoto
Kyoto Tower
Higashi Hongan-ji
Shimogyo-ku General Building
Campus Plaza Kyoto
Kyoto Central Post Office
Omron
Kyoto Bus Station

Nishinotoin Gate
Bic Camera JR Kyoto Station (JR Kyoto Station NK Building)

Hachijo Gate
Hotel Kintetsu Kyoto Station
Kyoto Avanti
Hotel Keihan Kyoto
Sightseeing Bus Terminal
Expressway Bus Terminal
New Miyako Hotel
To-ji
ÆON Mall Kyoto
PHP Institute

Bus terminals

Highway buses

Karasuma Gate

Karasuma Gate Bus Terminal 
 Dream / Hiru Tokkyu; For Shinjuku Station and Tokyo Station
 Harbor Light; For Hon-Atsugi Station, Machida Station, and Yokohama Station
 Dream Saitama; For Tachikawa Station, Higashi-Yamatoshi Station, Tokorozawa Station, and Ōmiya Station (Saitama)
 Keihanshin Dream Shizuoka; For Hamamatsu Station, Kakegawa Station, Yaizu, and Shizuoka Station
 Meishin Highway Bus; For Higashiomi, Taga, Ōgaki, and Nagoya Station
 Hokurikudo Hiru Tokkyu Osaka / Hokuriku Dream Osaka; For Fukui, Komatsu, Kanazawa Station and Toyama Station
 Seishun Dream Shinshu; For Nagano Station, Sakaki, Ueda Station, Tōmi, and Sakudaira Station
 Wakasa Maizuru Express Kyoto; For Nishi-Maizuru Station, Higashi-Maizuru Station, and Obama Station
 For Miyazu Station, Amanohashidate Station, Amino Station, and Taiza
 Tsuyama Express Kyoto; For Katō, Kasai, Shisō, Mimasaka, Shōō, and Tsuyama Station
 Miyako Liner; For Fukuyama Station and Onomichi Station
 Kyoto Express; For Akaiwa, Okayama Station, and Kurashiki Station
 Sanyodo Hiru Tokkyu Hiroshima / Seishun Dream Hiroshima; For Hiroshima University, Nakasuji Station, Hiroshima Bus Center, and Hiroshima Station
 Awa Express Kyoto; For Naruto, Matsushige, and Tokushima Station
 Takamatsu Express Kyoto; For Higashikagawa, Sanuki, Miki, and Takamatsu Station (Kagawa)
 Kochi Express; For Kōchi Station, Harimayabashi Station, Kōchi University, and Susaki Station
 Izumo no Okuni / Izumo Express Kyoto; For Matsue Station, Shinji, and Izumoshi Station
 Tottori Express Kyoto; For Chizu and Tottori Station
 Yonago Express Kyoto; For Yonago Station

Hotel New Hankyu Kyoto bus stop 
 Alpen Nagano; For Omi, Chikuma, and Nagano Station
 Alpen Matsumoto; For Okaya Station, Shiojiri, and Matsumoto Bus Terminal(Matsumoto Station)
 Alpen Suwa; For Okaya Station, Kami-Suwa Station, and Chino Station
 Sawayaka Shinshu; For Kamikōchi
 Okesa; For Sanjō-Tsubame, Katahigashi, and Nigata Station
 For Tonami Station, and Toyama Station
 Kyoto Osaka Liner; For Yoshida, Yaizu, Shin-Shizuoka Station, and Shimizu Station

Hachijo Gate

Hotel Keihan Kyoto bus stops 
 Airport Limousine; For Kansai International Airport
 Airport Limousine; For Osaka International Airport
 Tokyo Midnight Express Kyoto; For Shibuya Station and Shinjuku Station
 For Keisei Ueno Station, Asakusa(Kaminarimon), Tokyo Skytree, Nishi-Funabashi Station, Tokyo Disney Resort, Kaihin-Makuhari Station, Chiba Station and Kamatori Station
 Moonlight; For Kokura Station, Hakata Station, and Nishitetsu Fukuoka (Tenjin) Station
 For Tsuchiyama and Kintetsu Yokkaichi Station
 For Tsuchiyama, Seki, and Tsu Station
 Kyoto Express; For Kawauchi I.C., Okaido Station, and Matsuyama City Station
 For Kōchi Station, and Harimayabashi Station

Hachijo-Dori Street north side (Kintetsu Bus) 
 Arcadia; For KaminoyamaYandamagata Station
 Forest; For Sendai Station (Miyagi)
 Galaxy; For Nishigō, Sukagawa, Kōriyama Station, Nihonmatsu, and Fukushima Station
 Tochinoki; For Kuki Station, Tochigi Station, Kanuma, and Utsunomiya Station
 Seagull; For Hitachi, Takahagi Station, Isohara Station, and Iwaki Station
 Yokappe; For Tsukuba Station, Tsuchiura Station, Ishioka, and Mito Station
 Flying Liner; For Yokohama Station, Tokyo Station, Ueno Station, and Asakusa Station
 Fujiyama Liner; For Higashi-Shizuoka Station, Fuji Station, Fujinomiya Station, Taiseki-ji, Fuji-Q Highland, Kawaguchiko Station and Fujisan Station
 Kintaro; For Shin-Fuji Station, Numazu Station, Mishima Station, Gotemba Station, Shin-Matsuda Station, and Odawara Station
 Crystal Liner; For Hokuto, Nirasaki Station, Ryūō Station, and Kōfu Station
 Chikumagawa Liner; For Chikuma, Sakaki, Ueda Station, Tōmi, Sakudaira Station, and Karuizawa Station
 West Liner; For Gujō and Takayama Station
 Karst; For Ōtake, Iwakuni, Shūnan, Tokuyama Station, Hōfu Station, Yamaguchi, Mitō, and Hagi
 Shimanto Blue Liner; For Kubokawa Station, Tosa-Saga Station, Nakamura Station, and Sukumo Station
 Holland; For Ōmura, Isahaya, Nagasaki Station, and Nagasaki Shinchi Terminal
 Sunrise / Aso☆Kuma; For Kumamoto Bus Terminal and Kumamoto Station
 Ohisama; For Ebino, Kobayashi, Miyakonojō, and Miyazaki Station

Hachijo-Dori Street south side (Kintetsu Bus and Nankai Bus) 
This bus stop is in front of Nippon Rent-A- Car Kyoto Station East Exit Office.
 Silk Liner; For Saitama-Shintoshin Station, Ashikagashi Station, Ōta Station, Kiryū Station, Isesaki Station, Takasaki Station, and Maebashi Station
 Southern Cross; For Akihabara Station, Yotsukaidō Station, Tomisato, Keisei Narita Station, Narita International Airport, Sawara Station, and Chōshi Station
 Dream Wakayama; For Shinjuku Station, Tokyo Station, and Shin-Kiba Station
 Let's Go; For Hashimoto Station, Akishima Station, Tachikawa Station, and Tamagawa-Jōsui Station
 Southern Cross; For Odawara Station, Fujisawa Station, Kamakura Station, Ōfuna Station, and Totsuka Station
 Southern Cross; For Nagano Station, Suzaka Station, Shinshu-Nakano Station, Iiyama Station, and Yudanaka Station
 Southern Cross; For Kashiwazaki Station, Nagaoka Station, and Higashi-Sanjō Station
 Honokuni; For Toyokawa Station and Toyohashi Station
 For Yao Station and Kyūhōji Station
 Shirahama Blue Sky; For Inami, Haya Station, Kii-Tanabe Station, and Shirahama
 SORIN; For Nakatsu Station, Usa, Beppu, and Ōita Station

Hachijo-Dori Street south side (Osaka Bus) 
 Kyoto Tokkyu New Star; For Nagata Station and Fuse Station
 Tokyo Tokkyu New Star; For Tokyo Station, Akihabara Station, and Ōji Station

See also
 List of railway stations in Japan

References

External links

  - Kyoto Station Building Development
 Station map by West Japan Railway
 Station map by Central Japan Railway Company
 Station map by Kintetsu Corporation
 Station map by City of Kyoto

Railway stations in Kyoto
Railway stations in Japan opened in 1877
Sanin Main Line
Tōkaidō Main Line
Tōkaidō Shinkansen